Mélanie Marois (born 10 March 1984) is a former professional tennis player from Canada.

Biography
A right-handed player from Quebec, Marois was a regular competitor at the local Challenge Bell WTA Tour tournament, appearing in every main draw from 1999 to 2004.

Marois featured in the doubles rubber of four Fed Cup ties for Canada, all in 2004 and partnering Marie-Ève Pelletier.

Retiring in 2005 due to fibula tendonitis, she has since remained involved in tennis as an occasional commentator for Canadian French language broadcaster RDS.

ITF finals

Singles (3–2)

Doubles (3–5)

See also
List of Canada Fed Cup team representatives

References

External links
 
 
 

1984 births
Living people
Canadian female tennis players
Racket sportspeople from Quebec